The General Aircraft Monospar ST-25 was a British 1930s light twin-engined utility aircraft.

Design and development
The Monospar ST-25 was a low-wing cantilever monoplane with a fabric-covered metal structure. The monospar name came from the use of a single spar in the wing structure, that had been developed by H J Stieger. The cabin was enclosed with five seats. It was based on the GAL Monospar ST-10, with the addition of a folding seat for a fifth passenger, extra side windows, and the addition of a radio receiver. On 19 June 1935, the prototype (G-ADIV) made its first flight at Hanworth Air Park. It was designated Monospar ST-25 Jubilee, to honour the 25th anniversary of the reign of King George V.

Operational history
The last flying Monospar ST-25 (ZK-AFF), of Piet Van Asch, the owner of New Zealand Aerial Mapping Ltd, was lost in 1986 in a hangar fire.
The last surviving Monospar ST-25 (OY-DAZ), an ST-25 Ambulance, was fully restored during 1989–1999, and is now displayed in Egeskov Veteranmuseum at Egeskov Castle, Denmark.

Variants

  
Monospar ST-25 Jubilee
(1935-1936) Single fin and rudder. 30 built.
Monospar ST-25 De Luxe
One Monospar ST-25 Jubilee with a large single fin and two Niagara II engines, later converted to the prototype Monospar ST-25 Universal, with twin fins.
Monospar ST-25 Ambulance
Variants of both Monospar ST-25 Jubilee and ST-25 Universal, with a large door on the starboard side to allow a stretcher to be loaded.
Monospar ST-25 Universal
(1936-1939) Twin fin and twin rudder. 29 built, including the conversion of the De Luxe.
Monospar ST-25 Freighter
A variant of the Monospar ST-25 Universal, with a large freight door but without the passenger seating.
GAL.26
One modified Monospar ST-25 Jubilee, fitted with two Cirrus Minor I engines in 1936.
GAL.41
One experimental aircraft based on the Monospar ST-25 Universal. A new fuselage was built containing a pressurized section with two seats. Its purpose was to test possible pressurization systems for a proposed airliner, the GAL.40. The GAL.41 flew for the first time 11 May 1939, and was grounded in 1941.

Operators

Adelaide Airways

Eastern Canada Air Lines (five ST-25 Freighters, delivered in 1936)

ES-AXY "Vahur", in the service of the Ministry of Transport and Communications

Armée de l'Air (2 ST-25 in Indochine (Vietnam) in November 1945)

Van Melle's Confectionery Works, Breskens (one Jubilee, PH-IPM "Dubbele Arend", delivered in 1935)

New Zealand Aerial Mapping
Royal New Zealand Air Force

Royal Romanian Air Force

Spanish Republican Air Force

Spanish Air Force

General Command of Mapping (Turkey)
Turkish Government (two ST-25 Freighters for parachute training delivered in 1937)

Crilly Airways
Royal Aircraft Establishment (two Jubilees used for radio development)
Royal Air Force (impressed civil aircraft used during the second world war)

Specifications (Monospar ST-25 Jubilee)

See also
General Aircraft ST-18 Croydon

References

Citations

Bibliography
Howson, Gerald. 1990. Aircraft of the Spanish Civil War 1936–39. Putnam 
Jackson, A.J. (1973). British Civil Aircraft since 1919, Volume 2. Putnam. pp. 215–220, 519–521 
Lumsden, Alec; Heffernan, Terry. Probe Probare, Aeroplane Monthly, February 1984
Ogden, Bob (2009). Aviation Museums and Collections of Mainland Europe. Air-Britain. 
Stroud, John. Wings of Peace, Aeroplane Monthly, April 1988
 

1930s British civil utility aircraft
ST-25
Low-wing aircraft
Aircraft first flown in 1935
Twin piston-engined tractor aircraft